Local elections were held in Biñan on May 9, 2016, within the Philippine general election. The voters elected for the elective local posts in the city: the representative, mayor, vice mayor, the two provincial board members for Laguna and twelve councilors.

Overview
Incumbent Mayor Marlyn "Len-Len" Alonte-Naguiat is term-limited, she run unopposed as a representative of the newly created Lone District of Biñan the Liberal Party. Incumbent Vice Mayor Walfredo Dimaguila, Jr. is the party's nominee for Mayor. His opponents are former Mayor Hermis Perez and Cookie Yatco. Incumbent councilor Gel Alonte is running for Vice Mayor against Bobet Borja.

Candidates

Representative

Mayor

Vice Mayor

Councilors

|-bgcolor=black
|colspan=8|

References

2016 Philippine local elections
Elections in Biñan
2016 elections in Calabarzon